Rooms Katholieke Sport Vereniging Door Combinatie Groot (RKSV DCG)  is a Dutch association football club from Amsterdam.

History
DCG was established through the 11 September 1945 merger of DOSS (founded 6 November 1920),  Constantius (27 February 1921 in the St. Johannes Bergmans patronaat) and  Gezellen Vier (founded 9 April 1929 in de parochie van De Liefde, Da Costakade). This DCG was rebranded to Door Combinatie Groot. In 1968 the club achieved its biggest success when their Sunday amateur team won the national amateur championship of the Netherlands.

Honours 
 Overall Sunday championship
 Champion in 1968
 District Cup West I
 Winners in 1992

References

External links 
 RKSV DCG  Official website

Football clubs in the Netherlands
Association football clubs established in 1901
Football clubs in Amsterdam
1901 establishments in the Netherlands